Maxime Henry Armand Soulas (born 19 May 1999) is a French football player who plays as a centre-back for Danish Superliga club SønderjyskE.

Club career
On 1 July 2017, Soulas signed his professional deal with PSV Eindhoven, signing a contract until 2020. He made his Eerste Divisie debut for Jong PSV on 1 September 2017 in a game against Jong Ajax.

On 11 August 2020, Soulas joined Danish 1st Division club Fremad Amager. A year later, on 28 August 2021, Soulas moved to Danish Superliga club SønderjyskE, signing a deal until June 2025.

References

External links
 

1999 births
Living people
French footballers
French expatriate footballers
Association football defenders
Footballers from Montpellier
Montpellier HSC players
PSV Eindhoven players
Jong PSV players
Fremad Amager players
SønderjyskE Fodbold players
Eerste Divisie players
French expatriate sportspeople in the Netherlands
French expatriate sportspeople in Denmark
Expatriate footballers in the Netherlands
Expatriate men's footballers in Denmark